Chamum-e Bughar (also Romanized as Chamūm-e Būghār; also known as Būghār, Cham-e Qāẕī, Chamūm-e Yek, and Shākheh-ye Kūpāl-e Do) is a village in Howmeh-ye Gharbi Rural District, in the Central District of Ramhormoz County, Khuzestan Province, Iran. At the 2006 census, its population was 59, in 18 families.

References 

Populated places in Ramhormoz County